Heino (born 1938) is a German schlager and volksmusik music singer.

Heino may also refer to:

Heino (given name)
Heino (surname)
Heino, Netherlands, a village in the province of Overijssel
Heino railway station, a railway station in the village of Heino

See also
 Hino (disambiguation)